Triple Helix is a studio album by the Anat Cohen Tentet, released in 2019.

The album earned a Grammy Award nomination for Best Large Jazz Ensemble Album.

References

External links
 Triple Helix, anatcohen.com.

2019 albums
Jazz albums